Lapuerta is a surname. Notable people with the surname include:

Álvaro Lapuerta (1927–2018), Spanish politician
Rosario Silva de Lapuerta (born 1954), Spanish jurist and judge at the European Court of Justice